David Bradley Woodall (born June 25, 1969) is a former professional baseball pitcher. He played parts of five seasons in Major League Baseball between 1994 and 1999 for the Atlanta Braves, Milwaukee Brewers and Chicago Cubs.

Career
Woodall played college baseball for the University of North Carolina at Chapel Hill. While at UNC in 1990, he played collegiate summer baseball with the Wareham Gatemen of the Cape Cod Baseball League and was named a league all-star.

A left-hander, Woodall was signed by Atlanta as an amateur free agent in 1991. He made his Major League debut with the Braves on July 22, 1994, and appeared in his final game on May 5, 1999.

References

External links

Major League Baseball pitchers
Atlanta Braves players
Milwaukee Brewers players
Chicago Cubs players
Idaho Falls Braves players
Durham Bulls players
Greenville Braves players
Richmond Braves players
Louisville Redbirds players
Iowa Cubs players
Long Island Ducks players
Baseball players from Atlanta
North Carolina Tar Heels baseball players
Wareham Gatemen players
1969 births
Living people